4-Vinylcyclohexene dioxide (VCD) is an organic compound that contains two epoxide functional groups.  It is industrially used as a crosslinking agent for the production of epoxy resins. It is a colourless liquid.  It is an intermediate for synthesis of organic compounds.

Preparation and properties
4-Vinylcyclohexene dioxide is prepared by epoxidation of 4-vinylcyclohexene with peroxybenzoic acid. Its viscosity is 15 mPa·s.

Safety
4-Vinylcyclohexene dioxide, like other volatile epoxides, is classified as an alkylating agent. VCD has toxic effects on fertility. It is a killer of oocytes, eggs in a female's ovaries, in immature ovarian follicles in mice and rats.

In pest control, it has been used as an ovotoxic agent for reducing rat fertility.

References 

Epoxides
Cyclohexanes
Monomers